On 15 July 2014, at around 8:40 am MSK (UTC+04:00), an outbound Moscow Metro train derailed between Park Pobedy and Slavyansky Bulvar stations of the Arbatsko-Pokrovskaya Line. Casualties reported include 24 dead and 160 injured. Early reports suggested a power surge or a terrorist attack to be the cause of the derailment, but both were soon dismissed.

This accident was the deadliest ever recorded in the history of the Moscow metro system, and the second to occur due to a technical failure (after the 1982 Aviamotornaya escalator accident).

Background

The Moscow Metro, one of the busiest in the world and serving up to nine million passengers on a daily basis, covered  of route and included 194 stations at the time of the derailment. Despite having a reputation for reliability, the system had been increasingly suffering from mismanagement, cost-cutting practices, poor maintenance and outages in recent years.

According to several media reports, a Facebook user announced that two weeks prior to the disaster, he filed an official request to the head of the underground system reporting "problems with the tracks." The user quoted from the reply received in his e-mail: "The tracks are maintained in conformity with the technical standards and tolerances. Problems with mechanical switches in the joints have not been detected, being that the size of the gaps correspond to the technical regulations."

Derailment

The switch was installed a few weeks prior to the accident, as part of a construction project initiated in 2013 that was working to extend the Kalininskaya Line to the western part of Solntsevo District. Surviving passengers who were unable to cross the debris were evacuated through several construction drifts leading to the surface shaft.

There were no medical injuries reported from that train.

Early reports cited a power surge as the cause of the accident, but this has not been confirmed and remains under investigation. Passengers on the train described cars striking one another, with most of the impact occurring at the front of the train. The first car, where all of the deaths reportedly occurred, had jackknifed in on itself, and the cars behind it piled up on each other. The final two cars remained on the tracks and were only slightly damaged.

Victims
There were 24 killed in the accident (22 initially, 2 in hospitals), and about 118 were hospitalized. Seventeen of the victims were Russian citizens, and the remaining victims included 2 citizens of Tajikistan, 2 citizens of China, and one person each from Ukraine, Moldova and Kyrgyzstan. About 42 people remained in "serious condition". Another 200 people were evacuated from the Metro; those with injuries were attended outside the station. Initial reports stated that an additional 20 passengers remained underground, trapped in one of the cars. The train operator, a 29-year-old man, survived the crash, but was badly injured and had to undergo cranial surgery.

An accident witness reported to a news agency:

A spokesperson for the transport commission indicated that all passengers were "evacuated from the affected stations by midday". Terrorist threat was suspected, but quickly dismissed in this case. In the early morning of 17 July, personnel finished clearing away the debris and reported another casualty. In total, 17 corpses were removed from the debris, with the remainder of the victims succumbing to critical injuries within 24 hours of rescue. The tunnel was reportedly ready for repairs and night time maintenance as of 1:00 am local time on 18 July and restored to full functionality around 6:00 am.

Replacement service

 On Kievskaya, Kuncevskaya and Molodezhnaya entered in antipanic mode (pernamently opened gates). As result passengers on Kievskaya railway include VKO aeroexpress and who disembarked at Kuntsevo became free
 Detected illegal 523 bus (must ride Sokol to Skolkovo, de facto to Kuntsevo only)
 2 City Sightseeing buses as bonus on replacement service

Investigation
On 15 July 2014, the Investigative Committee of Russia opened a criminal investigation of the accident, according to part 3 of Article 263.1 of the Criminal Code (violation of the requirements of transport safety). Supervising examination of the accident site, investigators interviewed witnesses and employees. Vladimir Markin, the Committee's official representative, said that several causes for the accident were being considered, but that all were technical, there being no connection with terrorist attacks. He stated that certain people would be investigated and suspects would be identified.

On 16 July 2014, a senior track master and his assistant, who had worked on the installation of the new switch, were detained on a charge of negligence. According to investigators, they installed it incorrectly two months previously using a  wire instead of special equipment to forcibly lock the switch, as it led to a yet incomplete tunnel. This wire could have failed and got the switch stuck in an intermediate position, derailing the train. Unprofessional operation of the train was said to have been another contributing factor, as the previous train that had passed over the switch 3 to 4 minutes before the accident had been traveling at a lower speed, and thus had not derailed.

On 22 July 2014, Ivan Besedin, chief executive of the Moscow Metro, was removed from office by Mayor Sergey Sobyanin. Besedin was replaced by former chief executive of the high speed railway branch of Russian Railways, Dmitry Pegov, in order to restore Muscovites' faith in the metro safety.

Verdicts
The first trial on the matter ended and the verdicts were announced on 9 November 2015. Track master assistant Yuri Gordov was sentenced to 6 years of imprisonment, track repair deputy director Aleksei Trofimov, senior track master Valeri Bashkatov and deputy director of the subcontractor company "Spetstekhrekonstruktsiya" Anatoli Kruglov each were sentenced to 5.5 years of imprisonment. There is a separate investigation involving six additional defendants that was still ongoing at the time of conclusion of the first trial.

References

2014 disasters in Russia
2014 in Moscow
Derailments in Russia
derailment, 2014 Moscow Metro
July 2014 events in Russia
Railway accidents in 2014